Matilene Spencer Berryman (December 8, 1920 – May 6, 2003) was an American oceanographer and attorney. Originally from Prince Edward County, Virginia,  .

Early life 
Berryman was born in Darlington Heights, Prince Edward County, Virginia, to parents Mary and Charles Spencer. She was the fifth of nine children.

Education and career
Berryman earned a baccalaureate degree in mathematics from American University and a Masters in marine affairs, concentrating in oceanography and sonar engineering from the University of Rhode Island.

In 1957, she joined the U.S. Naval Oceanographic Office in Maryland and taught courses on statistics and dynamics of the ocean and underwater sound to US and foreign naval reserve officers. Berryman was a professor of marine science at the University of the District of Columbia in Washington, D.C. and served as Chair of the Department of Environmental Sciences from 1970 to 1981.

Berryman was a major advocate of education, which led to her appointment as Physical Science Administrator in the Executive Office of the President of the National Council on Marine Research and Development. Through this appointment, she served on an ad hoc committee to develop job opportunities for minorities in the marine science and oceanography fields.

She believed that education "is the key that could truly spell the difference between abject poverty and the extreme wealth of that one percent of the population". She continued her education by earning a law degree from Howard University.

Legal career
Berryman was admitted to the District of Columbia Bar on January 10, 1975. Shortly after, she established a legal practice in civil, environmental, and marine law. According to the National Association for Personal Injury Lawyers, she began practicing full-time as a solo practitioner in 1983. She specialized in probate law but also worked in personal injury law. Berryman was disbarred from practicing law in 2000 for commingling estate funds with her own and failing to fulfill the legal duties due to her client.

Publications 
Berryman wrote a book entitled Science of man's environment : principles of science and technology for environmental, marine, engineering, and ocean science technology, which was published in 1986.

Family 
Berryman had two daughters, D’Michele Berryman (1957-1995), was an engineer and attorney, and Dr. Sherrill Berryman Johnson (1947-2010), was a research scholar, dance artist, and educator.

Death
She died on May 6, 2003. Her personal papers were donated to the Moorland-Spingarn Research Center in 2010.

References

1920 births
2003 deaths
African-American women lawyers
African-American lawyers
American oceanographers
American University alumni
Howard University School of Law alumni
University of Rhode Island alumni
Women oceanographers
20th-century American women scientists
20th-century American scientists
20th-century American women lawyers
20th-century American lawyers
20th-century African-American women
20th-century African-American scientists
21st-century African-American people
21st-century African-American women